The Saint Michael's line is a postulated as a ley line also referred to as ‘The Apollo Line’ connecting monasteries dedicated to the Archangel Michael in Europe and in the Middle East. The aligned monasteries include Skellig Michael (Ireland), St Michael's Mount in Cornwall (UK), Mont Saint-Michel in Normandy (France), Sacra di San Michele (Italy), Chiesa di San Galgano (Italy), Tempio di San Michele di Perugia (Italy), Santuario di San Michele del Gargano (Italy), Delphi (Greece), Island of Delos (Greece), Symi (Greece), Kourion (Cyprus), and Mount Carmel (Israel), built over an extended period of time spanning from the 6th to the 13th century. The term is also used to refer to a similar alignment of sites linked to Saint Michael in the UK.

The Sacred Line perfectly aligns with the sunset on the day of the Northern Hemisphere’s Summer Solstice and is sometimes referred to as the "Sword of St. Michael," said to represent the blow with which St. Michael sent the devil to hell.

Interpretation 
As with other ley lines, no scientific evidence indicates that the alignment was planned and meaningful, making the claim pseudoscientific, but commonly reported at these sites. Physicist Luca Amendola noted that the deviation of these sites from the loxodrome that allegedly connects them ranges between 14 km and 42 km. 

According to legend the Sacred Line of Saint Michael the Archangel represents the blow the Saint inflicted the Devil, sending him to hell.

Some also say that it is a reminder from Saint Michael that the faithful are expected to be righteous, walking the straight path.

Gallery

References

Pseudoscience
Christian monasteries
Ley lines
Psychogeography